The Bornholm Cable is a submarine power cable under the Baltic Sea, connecting the power grid of the Danish island of Bornholm to the Swedish power grid owned by E.on with a capacity of 60 MW. It is owned by Energinet, previously by Östkraft.

There is an agreement between Svenska kraftnät and Energinet about balancing the Bornholm grid.

Cable sections 
The cable sections are:

 Hasle substation to Bornholm coast:  1.4km underground, 400mm conductors at 60kV
 Undersea section: 43.5km, 240mm conductors at 60kV
 Swedish coast to cable terminal: 700m underground, 400mm conductors at 60kV
 Cable terminal to Borrby substation: 4.2km overhead line with 127mm conductors at 60kV
 Borrby substation to Tomelilla substation: 132kV line with two circuits

Outages 
The undersea section has been repeatedly damaged: in 2004,  in 2010 and in 2013. The damage in 2013 cost half a million Danish crowns per day, due to electricity price differences between Bornholm and southern Sweden and the costs of two ships waiting for calm weather to repair the cable. 

Reserve generating capacity for when the cable is out of service is provided by coal power plants on Bornholm and by diesel generators to cover the start-up time of the coal plants. There is also a project using energy stored in electric vehicles as a backup supply for a period of hours.

In 2018 the cable was buried deeper in the seabed to prevent damage, but suffered failure due to a dragging ship anchor in early 2022.

References

See also 
 Electric power infrastructure on Bornholm

Electric power infrastructure in Denmark

Bornholm
Electric power infrastructure in Sweden
Submarine power cables
Connections across the Baltic Sea